Palmar digital nerves may refer to;

 Common palmar digital nerves of median nerve
 Common palmar digital nerves of ulnar nerve
 Proper palmar digital nerves of median nerve
 Proper palmar digital nerves of ulnar nerve